Acacia didyma is a shrub or small tree which is native to Western Australia.  It grows to between 1.5 metres and 4 metres in height and flowers from August to October (late winter to mid spring) in its native range.

Description
It occurs on East Wallabi Island in the Houtman Abrolhos as well as scattered locations near Shark Bay including Dirk Hartog Island and Carrarang and Tamala Stations

Taxonomy
The species was formally described in 1992 in the journal Nuytsia by Alex Chapman and Bruce Maslin, based on plant material collected at Shark Bay.

See also
List of Acacia species

Footnotes

References

didyma
Acacias of Western Australia
Fabales of Australia
Taxa named by Bruce Maslin
Plants described in 1992